Myron Winthrop "Mike" McCormick (May 6, 1917 – April 13, 1976) was an American professional baseball player. He was an outfielder for the Cincinnati Reds (1940–43 and 1946), Boston Braves (1946–48), Brooklyn Dodgers (1949), New York Giants (1950), Chicago White Sox (1950) and Washington Senators (1951) of Major League Baseball.

Biography

He helped the Reds win the 1940 World Series, and led the National League in sacrifice hits that season. Forty games into the 1942 season, McCormick was sidelined with a broken leg. He returned to the Reds for the 1943 season, but he was inducted into the military after only a few games. He missed the 1944 and 1945 seasons due to military service. He served in the Army Air Force and played on a military baseball team with Joe DiMaggio in Hawaii.

After the Braves won the 1948 National League pennant, he was traded from the Braves to the Brooklyn Dodgers in December of that year; he and an unnamed player were sent to Brooklyn in exchange for Pete Reiser. The Dodgers won the 1949 NL pennant. The next year, he was signed by the New York Giants, played for Oakland of the Pacific Coast League, and had his contract purchased by the Chicago White Sox that June.

In 10 seasons he played in 748 games and had 2,325 at bats, 302 runs, 640 hits, 100 doubles, 29 triples, 14 home runs, 215 RBI, 16 stolen bases, 188 walks, .275 batting average, .330 on-base percentage, .361 slugging percentage, 840 total bases and 72 sacrifice hits. Defensively, he recorded a .980 fielding percentage at all three outfield positions.

In April 1976, McCormick was attending a game at Dodger Stadium when he suffered a heart attack. He died at a Los Angeles hospital.

References

External links

1917 births
1976 deaths
Baseball players from California
Major League Baseball left fielders
Major League Baseball center fielders
Cincinnati Reds players
Boston Braves players
Brooklyn Dodgers players
New York Giants (NL) players
Chicago White Sox players
Washington Senators (1901–1960) players
Minor league baseball managers
Monessen Indians players
Zanesville Greys players
Butler Indians players
New Orleans Pelicans (baseball) players
Buffalo Bisons (minor league) players
Indianapolis Indians players
Oakland Oaks (baseball) players
Sacramento Solons players
Portland Beavers players
Wenatchee Chiefs players
San Francisco Seals (baseball) players
Wilkes-Barre Barons players
Johnstown Johnnies players
Pocatello Giants players
Lake Charles Lakers players